Kozeki Okada (born 19 July 1886, date of death unknown) was a Japanese equestrian. He competed in the individual dressage event at the 1928 Summer Olympics.

References

External links

1886 births
Year of death missing
Japanese male equestrians
Japanese dressage riders
Olympic equestrians of Japan
Equestrians at the 1928 Summer Olympics
Place of birth missing